Neocheritra is a genus of butterflies in the family Lycaenidae.

Species
 Neocheritra amrita (C. & R. Felder, 1860)
 Neocheritra fabronia (Hewitson, 1878)
 Neocheritra manata (Semper, 1890)
 Neocheritra namoa de Nicéville, 1894

References

, 1882-1886. Rhopalocera Malayana. 16 + 481 pp., 41 pls. London.
, 1860 [1859]. Lepidopterologische Fragmenta. Parts 4 and 5. Wiener Entomologische Monatschrift. 4:225-251, 2 pls., 394-402, 2 pls.
 , 1981: New Lycaenid Butterflies from the Philippines. Tyô to Ga 32 (1/2): 63-82. Abstract and full article: .
 , 1978: Neue Lepidoptera von den Philippinen, 3. Entomologische Zeitschrift 88 (14): 149-161.

Iolaini
Lycaenidae genera
Taxa named by William Lucas Distant